HHV Capsid Portal Protein, or HSV-1 UL-6 protein, is the protein which forms a cylindrical portal in the capsid of Herpes simplex virus (HSV-1).  The protein is commonly referred to as the HSV-1 UL-6 protein because it is the transcription product of Herpes gene UL-6.

The Herpes viral DNA enters and exits the capsid via the capsid portal.  The capsid portal is formed by twelve copies of portal protein arranged as a ring; the proteins contain a leucine zipper sequence of amino acids which allow them to adhere to each other.  Each icosahedral capsid contains a single portal, located in one vertex.

The portal is formed during initial capsid assembly and interacts with scaffolding proteins that construct the procapsid.

  When the capsid is nearly complete, the viral DNA enters the capsid (i.e., the DNA is encapsidated) by a mechanism involving the portal and a DNA-binding protein complex similar to bacteriophage terminase.  Multiple studies suggest an evolutionary relationship between Capsid Portal Protein and bacteriophage portal proteins.

When a virus infects a cell, it is necessary for the viral DNA to be released from the capsid.  The Herpes virus DNA exits through the capsid portal.

The genetic sequence of HSV-1 gene UL-6 is conserved across the family Herpesviridae and this family of genes is known as the "Herpesvirus UL6-like" gene family.  "UL-6" is nomenclature meaning that the protein is genetically encoded by the sixth (6th) open reading frame found in the viral genome segment named "Unique-Long (UL)".

Studies

Dodecameric structure

Research performed in 2004 used electron microscopy to predict that UL-6 forms 11, 12, 13, and 14-unit polymers.  The dodecameric form was found to be most likely.

Refinements to the electron microscopy in 2007 allowed finding that the portal is a twelve (12)-unit polymer present at one of the twelve capsid vertices instead of the UL-19 pentamer found at non-portal vertices.

Leucine zipper creates inter-protein adhesion

A study using deletion and mutation of the UL-6 amino acid sequence demonstrated the leucine residues in a predicted leucine zipper motif were required for formation of the dodecameric ring structure.

Early involvement in capsid assembly

Assembly of portal units is an initial step in constructing capsids of viral progeny.  Capsids assembled in the absence of portals lack portals.

Interaction with capsid scaffolding protein

In 2003, gel eletrophoresis studies demonstrated that intact UL-6 portals associate in vitro with viral protein UL-26.  This association is antagonized by that action of WAY-150138, a thiourea inhibitor of HHV encapsidation.

Further investigation during 2006 showed that assembly of capsid with portal depends on interaction of UL-6 with "scaffolding" protein UL-26.5, amino acids 143 through 151.

Interaction with terminase complex 
UL-6 associates with a UL-15/UL-28 protein complex during capsid assembly.  The UL-15/UL-28 is believed to bind with viral DNA and serve the same purpose as terminase by packing viral DNA into the capsid during capsid assembly.

Function during DNA egress 
The DNA exits the capsid in a single linear segment.  DNA exit may be controlled by UL-6 and dependent on temperature or environmental proteins.

References 

Simplexviruses
Viral genes
Viral structural proteins